Getterson Alves dos Santos (born 16 May 1991), simply known as Getterson, is a Brazilian footballer who plays as a forward for Bangladesh Premier League club Abahani Limited Dhaka.

Career
Getterson began his career in 2011 with Oeste, and later moving to Toledo in 2013. He signed with J. Malucelli later in the year. In June 2016, Getterson was loaned to São Paulo, but hours after the signing was announced, the contract was terminated after fans found disparaging remarks he had made four-years earlier about São Paulo fans on his, now idle, Twitter account. He had also proclaimed himself a fan of the club's rivals Corinthians, He was later loaned to Major League Soccer side FC Dallas on 9 July 2016.

On 20 January 2019, Getterson signed a contract with Marítimo.

On 13 October 2020, Getterson signed a contract with Al-Ain.

References

External links
MLS player profile

1991 births
Living people
Brazilian footballers
Association football forwards
Campeonato Brasileiro Série A players
Campeonato Brasileiro Série D players
Major League Soccer players
Primeira Liga players
Saudi Professional League players
Oeste Futebol Clube players
Toledo Esporte Clube players
J. Malucelli Futebol players
Boa Esporte Clube players
Volta Redonda FC players
São Paulo FC players
Coritiba Foot Ball Club players
FC Dallas players
C.S. Marítimo players
Al-Ain FC (Saudi Arabia) players
Abahani Limited (Dhaka) players
Brazilian expatriate footballers
Brazilian expatriate sportspeople in the United States
Expatriate soccer players in the United States
Expatriate footballers in Portugal
Brazilian expatriate sportspeople in Portugal
Expatriate footballers in Saudi Arabia
Brazilian expatriate sportspeople in Saudi Arabia